The 1979 Arkansas Razorbacks football team represented the University of Arkansas in the Southwest Conference (SWC) during the 1979 NCAA Division I-A football season. In their third year under head coach Lou Holtz, the Razorbacks compiled a 10–2 record (7–1 against SWC opponents), finished in a tie with Houston for the SWC championship, and outscored their opponents by a combined total of 284 to 132. The Razorbacks' only regular season loss was to Houston by a 13–10 score. The team advanced to the 1980 Sugar Bowl, losing to undefeated national champion Alabama by a 24–9 score.  Arkansas was ranked #8 in the final AP Poll and #9 in the final UPI Coaches Poll.

Offensive tackle Greg Kolenda was a consensus All-American for the Razorbacks in 1979. Placekicker Ish Ordonez led the nation in field goals with 18 and lead the Southwest Conference in scoring for the second year in a row with 80 points. He broke the NCAA record of 12 consecutive field goals making 16 and hit 18 of 22 field goals on the season, for an 82% average and was second-team All-American.  Quarterback Kevin Scanlon was selected the Southwest Conference Player of the Year and honorable mention All American.  As a defense, Arkansas was tied for 6th in scoring defense in the 1979 season, giving up 108 points in 11 games (9.8 ppg).

Schedule

Roster
RB Gary Anderson, Fresh
Jeff Goff (defense), Soph
DE Jim Howard
P Bruce Lahay
TE Darryl Mason
PK Ish Ordonez
Ricky Richardson (defense), Soph
QB Kevin Scanlon, Sr.
G George Stewart

Season summary

Texas

Texas' John Goodson missed a 51-yard field goal into a 24-mile per hour wind with 1:29 left to play as Arkansas beat the Longhorns for the first time since 1971.

References

Arkansas
Arkansas Razorbacks football seasons
Southwest Conference football champion seasons
Arkansas Razorbacks football